Sai Vignesh  is an Indian Carnatic vocalist, playback singer, and musician who predominantly works in Tamil and Telugu music and cinema. He shot to the limelight after being on Airtel Super Singer 4.  Since then he continued touring and performing in India and abroad. Sai made his debut in playback singing in 2018 with Eghantham, but it was the year 2022 that solidified his career as a playback singer with his work in several hit films like Sita Ramam and Kantara. He also was part of the chorus in the hit 2022 film Ponniyin Selvan: I. Sai made his Telugu playback singing debut in 2022 with "Anuragam Asai" from  Daarunam.

Biography 
Sai Vignesh began learning music from Smt. Lakshmi Ananthakrishnan and is currently under the guidance of Cuddalore Shri. T.R. Vasudevan. He is an All India Radio "B" high grade artist and is an empaneled artist of ICCR, Government of India.

Sai was a participant in singing reality show Airtel Super Singer 4 and made it to top 10. Sai was the winner of “Sing with Shankar Mahadevan Contest 2014“  conducted by Shankar Mahadevan Academy and got an opportunity to perform with Mr. Shankar Mahadevan at Banglore. Sai Vignesh has travelled around the globe and has performed in many leading organizations and sabhas. He has performed with Isaigyani Ilayaraja in his live concerts at Singapore, Perth, Erode, Chennai, Trichy, etc. Sai is also a singing instructor who has been training many aspiring singers and he was the mentor for "Star Singer" (a reality show in Jaya Tv).  In 2021, Sai co-founded an Indo-Classical Contemporary Fusion band called GANDIVA alongside dancer-choreographer Kavya Muralidaran.

Sai made his debut playback with “Oora Nenjila” song for the movie Eghaantham (2018)  composed by Ganesh Raghavendra and also was part of “Kaalai Theme” song in 2018 for the movie Kadaikutty Singam composed by D.Imman. In 2022, Sai had two highly successful releasing includes "Kurumugil" from the movie Sita Ramam composed by Vishal Chandrasekar and "Varaha Roopam" from the movie Kantara. Kantara made $365 million at the box office  Both "Kurumugil" and "Varaha Roopam" gained much acclaim with Kurumugil from Sita Ramam (soundtrack) hitting 8 million views on the video on YouTube, and around 4 million views on the lyrics video on YouTube. As of December 10, 2022 Varaha Roopam lyrics video crossed 37 Million views on YouTube.  As of March 6, 2023, Varaha Roopam lyrics video crossed 90 million views on YouTube.  Sai made his Telugu playback singing debut in 2022 with "Anuragam Asai" from  Daarunam. In December, to honor the success of Varaha Roopam, Sai released "Varaha Roopam" Unplugged, which immediately went viral.  On December 16, 2022 IMDB.in released a top 10 list of most popular Hindi movies of 2022. Of the ten, four (#5 Kantara, #6 Rocketry, #8 Sita Ramam, #9 Ponniyin Selvan: Part One) had songs sung by Sai Vignesh.

Playback Songs List 
 "Oora Nenjila" Eghaantham (2018)
 "Kaalai Theme" Kadaikutty Singam (2018)
 "Kurumugil" Sita Ramam (2022)
 "Rocketry's Shri Venkatesa Suprabatham" Rocketry (2022)
 "Devaralan Aattam" Ponniyin Selvan I (2022) - part of the backing vocals
 "Varaha Roopam" Kantara (2022) - Kannada
 "Varaha Roopam" Kantara (2022) - Hindi
 "Varaha Roopam" Kantara (2022) - Tamil
 "Varaha Roopam" Kantara (2022) - Telugu
 "Varaha Roopam" Kantara (2022) - Malayalam
 "Anuragam Asai" Daarunam (2022)
 "Nedumudi Yeaganein" Striker (2023)
 "Aroro Ariraaro" Ayothi (2023)

References

External links 

 Sai Vignesh Official
 Interview With India Glitz Nov 2022

Indian male playback singers
Male Carnatic singers
Tamil musicians
Telugu-language singers
Living people
Year of birth missing (living people)